The Ürümqi Metro or Ürümqi Subway is a rapid transit system in operation in Ürümqi, capital of the Xinjiang Autonomous Region in China.

The Ürümqi Metro has submitted plans for two lines, Line 1 and Line 2, with an estimated cost of 31.24 billion yuan.

Lines

Line 1

Line 1 runs from Ürümqi Diwopu International Airport through downtown Ürümqi and ends at Santunbei station. It has a total length of 27.615 km and 21 stations. It is fully underground.

Line 1 started construction on 20 March 2014. The northern section of the line was opened on 25 October 2018. The southern section of the line was opened on 28 June 2019.

Under construction

Line 2
Line 2 is under construction. The line have 16 stations from Yan'an Road to Huashan Street. Line 2 will serve Ürümqi railway station. The section from Nanmen to Huashan Street will open in 2022.

Line 3

Line 4

Future Development



Network Map

See also
 List of metro systems
Ürümqi BRT

References

Rapid transit in China
Metro
Railway lines opened in 2018
2018 establishments in China